Capital punishment in Georgia was completely abolished on 1 May 2000 when Protocol 6 to the ECHR was signed. Later Georgia also adopted the Second Optional Protocol to the ICCPR. Capital punishment was replaced with life imprisonment.

The last death sentence carried out in Georgia took place in 1995. It was carried out for murder; the prisoner was executed by a single shot to the back of the head.

References
 https://web.archive.org/web/20050324105012/http://www.geocities.com/richard.clark32%40btinternet.com/europe.html

Georgia
Law enforcement in Georgia (country)
Death in Georgia (country)
Human rights abuses in Georgia (country)
2000 disestablishments in Georgia (country)